Randy Gardner (born December 2, 1958) is an American former pair skater. Together with Tai Babilonia, he won the 1979 World Figure Skating Championships and five U.S. Figure Skating Championships (1976–1980). The pair qualified for the 1976 and 1980 Winter Olympics.

Career
Babilonia and Gardner began skating together when Babilonia was eight and Gardner ten. Their first coach was Mabel Fairbanks, and later they were coached by John Nicks. The pair became five-time U.S. national champions and won the gold medal at the 1979 World Championships. They were medal favorites at the 1980 Winter Olympics but were forced to withdraw due to a thigh injury to Gardner.

In 2006, Gardner appeared as a choreographer on the reality television series Skating with Celebrities. In 2008, he indicated that he was working on his autobiography which was to be released at the end of the year. It has not been released. In 2008, Babilonia and Gardner announced their retirement from show skating due to a neck injury sustained by Gardner and their advancing ages.

Personal life 
Gardner discovered in 1998 that he was adopted after a relative divulged the family secret. After a five-year search, he found his birth mother who had become pregnant with him at age 17 after being raped by a family friend. In 2006, Gardner revealed that he is gay.

Competitive highlights
(with Babilonia)

References

External links
 
 

+

1958 births
American male pair skaters
Olympic figure skaters of the United States
Figure skaters at the 1976 Winter Olympics
Figure skaters at the 1980 Winter Olympics
Living people
Figure skaters from Los Angeles
World Figure Skating Championships medalists
LGBT figure skaters
American LGBT sportspeople
LGBT people from California
Gay sportsmen